Greenbank is a Liverpool City Council Ward in Liverpool Riverside Parliamentary constituency. The population of this ward at the 2011 was 16,132. It was formed for the 2004 municipal elections incorporating most of the former Arundel ward and parts of the former Aigburth and Picton wards.

Councillors
The ward has returned seven councillors.

 indicates seat up for re-election after boundary changes.

 indicates seat up for re-election.

 indicates change in affiliation.

 indicates seat up for re-election after casual vacancy.

Election results

Elections of the 2020s

Elections of the 2010s 

{{Election box candidate with party link|
  |party      = Labour Party (UK)
  |candidate  = Jon Morris
  |votes      = 1553
  |percentage = 45.46%
  |change     =  11.96}}

 Elections of the 2000s 

After the boundary change of 2004 the whole of Liverpool City Council faced election. Three Councillors were returned.

• italics denotes the sitting Councillor
• bold''' denotes the winning candidate

External links
Ward profile Greenbank

References

Wards of Liverpool